I Remember Bird is an album by American jazz saxophonist Sonny Stitt featuring performances recorded in 1976 for the Catalyst label.

Reception

The Allmusic site awarded the album 4½ stars, stating, "Sonny Stitt, who spent his entire career playing in a style built on Bird's, is in good form during this quintet date".

Track listing
 "Waltz For Diane" (Frank Rosolino) 6:07  
 "Body and Soul" (Johnny Green, Edward Heyman, Robert Sour, Frank Eyton) - 5:14  
 "Jeepers Creepers" (Harry Warren, Johnny Mercer) - 9:10  
 "Streamlined Stanley" (Sonny Stitt) - 3:55  
 "I Remember Bird" (Leonard Feather) - 5:08  
 "Watch What Happens" (Michel Legrand) - 8:33  
 "Yes Jesus Loves Me" (Anna Bartlett Warner) - 7:17

Personnel
Sonny Stitt - tenor saxophone
Frank Rosolino - trombone
Dolo Coker - piano
Allen Jackson - bass 
Clarence Johnston - drums

References

1977 albums
Catalyst Records (jazz) albums
Sonny Stitt albums